Herbert Wood Abbott (1875 – 22 October 1911) was an English footballer who played at centre half in the Football League for Nottingham Forest. 
He was born in Devizes, Wiltshire in Q4 1875.

Bert Abbott played for Ruddington prior to playing for Nottingham Forest.
He made his league debut for Forest on 1 January 1895 in the 0–0 draw away at Blackburn Rovers.

Abbott mainly played for the Nottingham Forest Reserve team.

After his time at Forest, in 1897 Abbott moved to Sheppey United on the Isle of Sheppey.

Death
After his football career, Abbott became an Artificer serving in the Royal Navy. He died whilst diving from the yard-arm of the floating barrack HMS Calcutta on 22 October 1911 in Gibraltar. He was stunned on contact with the water and drowned. He was 35 years old.

Career statistics

References

1875 births
1911 deaths
English footballers
Association football forwards
English Football League players
Nottingham Forest F.C. players
Sheppey United F.C. players
Royal Navy officers
Deaths by drowning in the United Kingdom
20th-century Royal Navy personnel